Diego Rodriguez de Valdés y de la Banda (1557-1600) was a Spanish marine and politician, who served as governor of Buenos Aires.

Biography 
He was born in Salamanca, Spain, and arrived in the city of Buenos Aires as commander of the ship "San Andres", which arrived on the shores of the Río de la Plata on 5 January 1599 from Rio de Janeiro.  

A few months after taking as governor, he received the news, the uprising of the Indians in Chile, with very few resources in Buenos Aires, Valdez sent a small detachment of soldiers commanded by his cousin Francisco Rodriguez del Manzano. 

Diego Rodriguez de Valdés y de la Banda served as governor of the Río de la Plata from 8 July 1599 until his death on 20 December 1600.

References 

1557 births
1600s deaths
People from Salamanca
16th-century Spanish people
17th-century Spanish people
Spanish nobility
Spanish Roman Catholics
Spanish colonial governors and administrators
Río de la Plata